The Noohani (Urdu: نوحانی) (Sindhi: نوحاڻي) is a Baloch origin Sindhi tribe and amongst the largest tribes of Sindh province of Pakistan. Noohanis currently reside all over Pakistan, especially in the Sehwan, Thar, and Khairpur cities of Sindh province and their surroundings. Many Noohanis are inhabitants of Lasbela District, Balochistan. Many Noohani are  nationals of Iran, also. Noohani caste has Sardars in every subcaste, and they also have a Chief tribal Sardar who leads the whole tribe. The current Chief Sardar is Sardar Hakim Khan Noohani, son of late Chief Sardar Mohammad Khan Noohani who remained Chief Sardar till his death on 16 August 2015. Sardar Hakim Khan Noohani is currently leading as the chief Sardar of Noohani tribe. Chief Sardar Hakim Khan is a reputable activist and politician.

Noohani Dynasty

Noohani Dynasty was an important dynasty in Bihar, India. It originated from Sikandar Lodhi's period of political shifts. As Sikandar Lodhi gained power, the governor of Jaunpur fled to Bihar Tirhut and Saran's Zamindars opposed central rule. All this led Lodhi to invade Bihar. Sikandar Lodi defeated Shah Shargi and appointed Bihar administrator, who remained Bihar administrator until he died in 1523. After his father's death, his son Bahar Khan Noohani became an administrator. In 1523, Bahar Khan Noohani succeeded to the throne. He declared independence and took Sultan Mohammad's title. Ibrahim Lodhi invaded his later. Initially, the Delhi army won but later defeated.

British travelers John Marshall and Bernier visited Patna, Bhagalpur, Munger, Hazipur, discussing their prosperity. The Mughals' fight to annex Bihar begins with Ghaghar's battle between Babur and Sultan Mohammad in 1527 AD. The Noohani Dynasty ended in 1532 AD when Mughal Emperor Humayun defeated Afghans in Doha Sarah. He assaulted Chunar Fort in Al 1531.

Notable Noohani
Sardar Hakim Khan Noohani
Mariyam Sultana Noohani

References

Social groups of Pakistan
Baloch tribes